Bernadett Kőszegi (11 August 1958 – 22 March 2015) was a Hungarian volleyball player. She competed in the women's tournament at the 1980 Summer Olympics.

References

1958 births
2015 deaths
Hungarian women's volleyball players
Olympic volleyball players of Hungary
Volleyball players at the 1980 Summer Olympics
Sportspeople from Szombathely